Baystate was a Japanese jazz record label.

Some of these album were also released on the Japanese labels Victor and Horo Records.    Almost none have been reissued on LP or CD.

Discography

6000s
RVJ-6001: M'Boom - Re: Percussion
RVJ-6003: Charles Greenlee - I Know About the Life  (1977)
RVJ-6005: Toshiko Akiyoshi – Lew Tabackin Big Band - Live at Newport '77
RVJ-6006: Woody Shaw, Azar Lawrence, David Schnitter - Black Renaissance  1976
RVJ-6009: Zenzile Featuring Marion Brown - Zenzile Featuring Marion Brown  (1977)
RVJ-6011: Hannibal and Sunrise Orchestra - Live in Lausanne  (1978)
RVJ-6013: Warren Smith - Folks Song
RVJ-6015: Kalaparusha - Kwanza Kalaparusha
RVJ-6016: Max Roach & Dollar Brand - Streams of Consciousness
RVJ-6021: Max Roach -  Solos  (1978)
RVJ-6022: Robert Ruff - Shaza-Ra  (1978)
RVJ-6023: Hannibal and Sunrise Orchestra - The Light  (1984)
RVJ-6024: Marion Brown - Passion Flower  (1978)
RVJ-6025: Charles Tolliver - New Tolliver  (1978)
RVJ-6026: Matt Dennis - Angel Eyes
RVJ-6027: Hidefumi Toki & the Super Jazz Trio - City (1978)
RVJ-6028: Roy Brooks & The Artistic Truth - Live at Town Hall  (1978)
RVJ-6029: Max Roach Quartet - Live in Amsterdam (1977)
RVJ-6030: Sunny Murray's Untouchable Factor - Apple Cores (also released on Philly Jazz)
RVJ-6031: Toshiko Akiyoshi – Lew Tabackin Big Band - Salted Gingko Nuts
RVJ-6033: Tommy Flanagan, Reggie Workman, Joe Chambers - The Super Jazz Trio
RVJ-6036: Marion Brown - Soul Eyes  (1979)
RVJ-6037: Charles Mingus - The Music of Charles Mingus (1977)
RVJ-6043: Hannibal Marvin Peterson - Tribute  (1979)
RVJ-6052: Art Matthews - It's Easy to Remember
RVJ-6056: Art Farmer with the Super the Jazz Trio - Something Tasty
RVJ-6066: Marion Brown - November Cotton Flower  (1979)
RVJ-6083: Billy Harper -  The Believer
RVJ-6088: Toshiko Akiyoshi – Lew Tabackin Big Band - Live at Newport II
RVJ-6089: Super Jazz Trio - The Standards

8000s
RJL-8005: Karin Krog, Red Mitchell - But Three's a Crowd
RJL-8013: Benny Golson featuring Curtis Fuller - California Message (1981)
RJL-8018: Joe Chambers - New York Concerto
RJL-8025: Kazu Matsui - Time No Longer  (1981)
RJL-8026: Benny Golson Quintet featuring Curtis Fuller - One More Mem'ry (1982)
RJL-8033: Art Blakey - Art Blakey and the Allstar Jazz Messengers
RJL-8039: Kenny Drew - Moonlit Desert
RJL-8040: Guanabara - The Brazilian Beat of Guanabara
RJL-8054: Benny Golson - Time Speaks (1983)
RJL-8057: Timeless All Stars - Timeless Heart  (1983)
RJL-8065: Thomas Clausen  - The Shadow of Bill Evans
RJL-8071: Art Blakey - Caravan  (1983)
RJL-8074: Kenny Drew Trio - Fantasia  (1984)
RJL-8085: Cedar Walton - The All American Trio
RJL-8089: The New Jazztet - Nostalgia
RJL-8092: Benny Golson - This Is for You, John (1984)
RJL-8096: Bobby Hutcherson & the Super Four - Nice Groove
RJL-8099: Guanabara -  On the Move
RJL-8095: Freddie Hubbard - The Rose Tattoo
RJL-8103: Kenny Barron - Landscape (1985)
RJL-8104: Eugen Cicero  - Jazz Bach (1985)
RJL-8105: Art Blakey - On the New Tradition
RJL-8106: Kenny Drew Trio - By Request (1985)

0000s
RJL-2608: Don Friedman - Later Circle
RJL-2609: Toshiko Akiyoshi – Lew Tabackin Big Band - March of the Tadpoles (1983)
RJL-2678: Toshiko Akiyoshi-Lew Tabackin Big Band - Live at Newport '77 (1984)
RJL-2684: Hannibal and Sunrise Orchestra - The Light  (1984)
RVJ-9005/06: Max Roach - The Loadstar
RDC15: Roy Brooks - The Smart Set

References

Japanese record labels
Jazz record labels